Thomas McKay (January 8, 1839 – January 13, 1912) was a Canadian politician.

Born in Pictou County, Nova Scotia, the son of William McKay, who emigrated from Sutherland, Scotland, McKay was educated in Pictou. In 1868, he married Jessie Blair. A merchant, he was first elected to the House of Commons of Canada for Colchester in the 1874 general election. Unseated on petition in November 1874, he was re-elected and again in 1878. He resigned in June 1881 and was called to the Senate on the advice of John Alexander Macdonald on December 24, 1881 representing the senatorial division of Truro, Nova Scotia. A Liberal-Conservative, he served for 37 years until his death in 1912 in Truro.

References

External links
 

1839 births
1912 deaths
Canadian senators from Nova Scotia
Conservative Party of Canada (1867–1942) MPs
Conservative Party of Canada (1867–1942) senators
Members of the House of Commons of Canada from Nova Scotia
People from Pictou County
Canadian people of Scottish descent